Aphyolebias is a genus of New World killifish from the family Rivulidae. Although this genus is recognised by Fishbase  In 1998, it was suggested that several species from the genus Moema be moved to the new Aphyolebias. Genetic research has indicated that Moema is paraphyletic and monophyly is only established when it is merged with the genus Aphyolebias. The Catalog of Fishes records Aphyolebias as a synonym of Moema.

Species
The following species are classified as being in Aphyolebias:

Aphyolebias boticarioi Costa, 2004
Aphyolebias claudiae Costa, 2003
Aphyolebias manuensis Costa, 2003 
Aphyolebias obliquus Costa, Sarimento & Barrera, 1996
Aphyolebias peruensis (Myers, 1954)  (Peruvian longfin)
Aphyolebias rubrocaudatus (Seegers, 1984)
Aphyolebias schleseri Costa, 2003
Aphyolebias wischmanni (Seegers, 1983)

References 

Rivulidae
Ray-finned fish genera